Ivan Shyshkin born 16 September 1983), is a former Ukrainian football midfielder.

Honours as player

External links 

 Stats on Sevstopol club

1983 births
Sportspeople from Magdeburg
Living people
Ukrainian footballers
FC Sevastopol players
Association football midfielders
FC Sevastopol (Russia) players
FC Nyva Ternopil players
FC Cherkashchyna players
FC Ihroservice Simferopol players
Footballers from Saxony-Anhalt